Pomeroy Parker (March 17, 1874 – December 30, 1946) was a private serving in the United States Marine Corps during the Spanish–American War who received the Medal of Honor for bravery.

Biography
Parker was born on March 17, 1874, in Gates County, North Carolina. He joined the Marine Corps from Norfolk, Virginia in September 1892. In May 1899, shortly before his medal was awarded to him, he received a bad conduct discharge.

Parker died on December 30, 1946, and is buried at Roxobel-Kelford Cemetery in Roxobel, North Carolina.

Medal of Honor citation
Rank and organization: Private, U.S. Marine Corps. Born: 17 March 1874, Gates County, N.C. Accredited to: North Carolina. G.O. No.: 521, 7 July 1899.

Citation:

On board the U.S.S. Nashville during the operation of cutting the cable leading from Cienfuegos, Cuba, 11 May 1898. Facing the heavy fire of the enemy, Parker displayed extraordinary bravery and coolness throughout this action.

See also

List of Medal of Honor recipients for the Spanish–American War

References

External links

1874 births
1946 deaths
United States Marine Corps Medal of Honor recipients
United States Marines
American military personnel of the Spanish–American War
People from Gates County, North Carolina
Burials in North Carolina
Spanish–American War recipients of the Medal of Honor